Ceylanosybra baloghi is a species of beetle in the family Cerambycidae, and the only species in the genus Ceylanosybra. It was described by Breuning in 1975.

References

Apomecynini
Beetles described in 1975
Monotypic Cerambycidae genera